The 2016 Canterbury-Bankstown Bulldogs season is the 82nd in the club's history. Coached by Des Hasler and captained by James Graham, they will compete in the National Rugby League's 2016 Telstra Premiership after finishing the 2015 season as semi-finalists.

Fixtures

Regular season

The Bulldogs started the season strongly, comfortably beating the Manly-Warringah Sea Eagles in round one. The Bulldogs were the outsiders with the bookmakers, with most rugby league experts citing the size of the forward pack as an issue with the 2016 season rule change, which dropped the interchanges allowed from 10 to 8. However, the Bulldogs surprised the rugby league community by unveiling a significantly leaner pack, with players having shed a lot of weight during the off season. Sam Kasiano was an example of this, having lost 13 kg before the season kicked off. Any concerns about the interchange rule affecting the team were put to rest with the side coming away with a convincing 28-6 first round victory, and a week later a last minute win against the Penrith Panthers proving the big men would not falter late in matches as a result of more minutes played. As though the team was further driving the point home, they completed the second round match using only 16 of the 17 named players.

The month that followed was not as impressive, with the club going loss, win, loss, win, for a 4-3 record after 7 rounds.

Ladder

References

See also
 List of Canterbury-Bankstown Bulldogs seasons

Canterbury-Bankstown Bulldogs seasons
Canterbury-Bankstown Bulldogs season